Le Caire is a commune in the Alpes-de-Haute-Provence department in southeastern France, about 30 km north of Sisteron. The town's principal economic activity is aboriculture.

Population
Its inhabitants are called Cairois.

Tourism
The town's via ferrata, named Via ferrata de la grande fistoire, was created in 1996. In 2006, the via had been climbed by 40,000 people. It is also the nearest via ferrata to Marseille.

The town's old lime plaster mill was declared an historic monument in 1996.

See also
Communes of the Alpes-de-Haute-Provence department

References

Communes of Alpes-de-Haute-Provence
Alpes-de-Haute-Provence communes articles needing translation from French Wikipedia